Cliff Yiskis (April 18, 1929 — November 20, 2011) was a NASCAR driver from Cupertino, California. He competed in one Cup series event in his career. That came in 1957, when Yiskis had a solid qualifying effort of 10th at Eureka Speedway. From there, Yiskis was able to move through the field to a 4th-place finish. Yiskis raced for years in Super Modifieds at San Jose Speedway in San Jose, California and Kearney Bowl Speedway in Fresno, California; finishing 10th in NASCAR State of California points in 1968.

Yiskis was inducted into the San Jose Speedway Hall of Fame in 1999.

Motorsports career results

NASCAR 
(key) (Bold – Pole position awarded by qualifying time. Italics – Pole position earned by points standings or practice time. * – Most laps led.)

Grand National Series

Pacific Coast Late Model Division

References

External links
 

NASCAR drivers
People from Cupertino, California
People from the San Francisco Bay Area
Racing drivers from California
1929 births
2011 deaths